Am Universum is the fifth album by Finnish heavy metal band Amorphis. This album was a departure from the doom/stoner metal influence on their previous album, Tuonela, featuring more of a vocal-driven hard rock sound. This is the first album to feature Niklas Etelävuori on bass who would remain in the band until 2017.

The song "Alone" is also on the live DVD, Forging the Land of Thousand Lakes. The edited version of the song is on the single itself, and is also on Amorphis' greatest hits compilation album, Chapters. The DVD and the compilation both have the music video for the song. Other songs that are also on the compilation are "Too Much to See", which is also on the "Alone" single and "Drifting Memories".

Track listing

Personnel

Amorphis 
 Pasi Koskinen – vocals
 Esa Holopainen – lead guitar
 Tomi Koivusaari – rhythm guitar
 Niclas Etelävuori – bass
 Santeri Kallio − keyboards, synthesizer
 Pekka Kasari − drums

Session musicians 
 Sakari Kukko − saxophone on tracks 1, 5, 6, 8, 10
 Antti Halonen − saw on track 10

References 

2001 albums
Amorphis albums
Relapse Records albums